This is a list of state prisons in Idaho. There are no federal prisons in Idaho and this list does not include county jails located in the state of Idaho.

The state contracted with the Corrections Corporation of America to operate the Idaho Correctional Institution - Orofino until the state took back operations in January 2014.  CCA also operates the largest prison in the state, the Idaho Correctional Center, although Idaho Governor Butch Otter announced in January 2014 that its contract would not be renewed.

Idaho also exports state prisoners to CCA's Kit Carson Correctional Center in Colorado.

Community Work Centers 

 East Boise Community Work Center
 Idaho Falls Community Work Center
 Nampa Community Work Center
 South Idaho Correctional Institution Community Work Center

Prisons 

 Correctional Alternative Placement Program (432 inmate capacity)
 Idaho State Correctional Center
 Idaho Maximum Security Institution (402 inmate capacity)
 Idaho State Correctional Institution
 South Boise Women's Correctional Center (284 inmate capacity)
 South Idaho Correctional Institution (656 inmate capacity)
 North Idaho Correctional Institution (414 inmate capacity)
 Idaho Correctional Institution - Orofino (541 inmate capacity)
 Pocatello Women's Correctional Cent (289 inmate capacity)
 St. Anthony Work Camp (240 inmate capacity)

References

External links
Idaho Department of Correction

 
Idaho
Prisons